RingCentral, Inc. is an American publicly traded provider of cloud-based communication and collaboration products and services for businesses.

CEO Vlad Shmunis and CTO Vlad Vendrow founded the company in 1999. Investors included Doug Leone, Sequoia Capital, David Weiden, Khosla Ventures, Rob Theis, Scale Venture Partners, Bobby Yerramilli-Rao, Hermes Growth Partners and DAG Ventures. It completed its IPO in 2013.

History

RingCentral founders Shmunis and Vendrow previously worked together at RingZero Systems, where Shmunis was founder/CEO and Vendrow was director of engineering. RingZero was focused on small business communications on Microsoft Windows. The company was sold to Motorola for "double-digit millions". After Motorola changed the focus exclusively on mobile platforms, Shmunis and Vendrow founded RingCentral.

RingCentral was bootstrapped from 1999 until it received its first round of venture capital investment in 2006. In 2011, it added Cisco and Silicon Valley Bank as investors and had, to date, secured $45 million in capital investment. It completed its ISO on September 27, 2013, and completed a follow-on offering in March 2014 that raised $39.8 million.

In May 2019, it purchased naming rights to the Oakland Coliseum, renaming RingCentral Coliseum.

In February 2020, RingCentral and Avaya unveiled the Avaya Cloud Office application. Within four months, RingCentral shares rose 54%.

In April 2020, RingCentral launched RingCentral Video, a video-conferencing product.

Acquisitions

In June 2015, RingCentral acquired Glip, a team collaboration provider. In October 2018, it acquired Dimelo, a Paris-based OmniChannel contact center provider.

In January 2019, it acquired Connect First, a Boulder, Colorado-based outbound and blended customer engagement provider.

In December 2020, it purchased DeepAffects, which specializes in intelligence-assisted speech recognition. In March 2021, it purchased Kindite, an encryption service provider.

Products
RingCentral's flagship product is RingCentral Office. The company also offers RingCentral Professional, and RingCentral Fax.

It also provides a cloud-based business phone system with PBX features such as multiple extensions, call control; Outlook, Salesforce, Google Docs, DropBox and Box integration; SMS; video conferencing and web conferencing; fax; auto-receptionist; call logs; and rule-based call routing and answering. Unlike most cloud-based technologies, business customers are not required to invest capital or purchase maintenance contracts.

RingCentral Office 
RingCentral Office is a cloud-based PBX system for businesses. RingCentral Office features include call auto-attendant, company directory, call forwarding and handling, multiple extensions, a mobile app for iPhone and Android, Business SMS, video conferencing and screen-sharing, and fax.

RingCentral Professional 
RingCentral Professional is a suite that provides a telephone number, voice mail, dial-by-name directory, call forwarding, and other features through iPhone and Android apps for phones and other devices.

RingCentral Fax 
RingCentral Fax lets users send and receive faxes via the Internet without a fax machine. It integrates with Dropbox, Box, and Google Docs.

Other products 
RingCentral Meetings is a video conferencing product based on the Zoom software application.

RingCentral Glip 
In June 2015, RingCentral acquired Glip, a persistent workstream collaboration platform that adds team messaging, document sharing, task and event management, and other collaboration functionality to the RingCentral platform.

Offices

RingCentral's headquarters are in Belmont, California, with other US offices in Denver, Charlotte, Boulder and Boca Raton. It has international offices in Toronto; London; Sofia, Bulgaria ; Spain; Paris; Singapore; Manila; Bangalore; Xiamen, China; and Odessa, Ukraine.

References

External links
 

Telecommunications companies of the United States
American companies established in 1999
Companies based in San Mateo, California
VoIP companies
Cloud communication platforms
2013 initial public offerings
Companies listed on the New York Stock Exchange
1999 establishments in California